Spirulina ardissoni  is a cyanobacteria from the family Microcoleaceae.

References

Further reading 
 

 

Oscillatoriales
Bacteria described in 1907